Sarcoptoidea is a superfamily of mites, including many associated with mammals.

References

Sarcoptiformes
Arachnid superfamilies